Alexander Baker may refer to:
Alexander Baker (Jesuit) (1582–1638), English Jesuit
Alexander Baker (MP) (1611–1685), English lawyer and politician
Alex Baker, musician in Seven Summers

See also
Al Baker (disambiguation)